Henning Prüfer (born 7 March 1996) is a German athlete specialising in the discus throw. He won a bronze medal at the 2019 Summer Universiade. Earlier he won a silver at the 2014 World Junior Championships.

His personal best in the event is 65.26 metres set in UNION-Stadion,Schönebeck in 2021.

International competitions

References

1996 births
Living people
German male discus throwers
Universiade bronze medalists for Germany
Universiade medalists in athletics (track and field)
Medalists at the 2019 Summer Universiade
Sportspeople from Rostock